The 2009 Bahrain 1st Speedcar Series round was a Speedcar Series motor race held on 23 and 24 January 2009 at Bahrain International Circuit in Sakhir, Bahrain. It was the second round of the 2008–09 Speedcar Series.

Classification

Qualifying

Race 1

Race 2

See also 
 2009 Bahrain 1st GP2 Asia Series round

References

Speedcar Series
Speedcar